The Van Halen Tour 2004 was a North American concert tour by hard rock band Van Halen. It was the band's first tour since 1998 and saw the return of lead singer Sammy Hagar, who left the band in 1996 after tensions with lead guitarist Eddie Van Halen.

Tensions between Hagar and Eddie Van Halen were rekindled during the rehearsals before the tour even started and continued until the last show. The 2004 tour marked the last time that Hagar would ever perform with Van Halen. Some points of contention between the two included Eddie's increased struggles with substance abuse and Sammy Hagar’s promotion of his personal Cabo Wabo tequila brand. The tour also signaled the declining relationship of bassist Michael Anthony with Eddie and Alex Van Halen. During the 2004 tour, Anthony was forced to lose his licensing rights to the band and to take a pay cut due to tensions with the Van Halen brothers.

While commercially successful attendence was an issue, the tour generally received poor reviews from critics, with some alleging that Eddie was sloppy, unfocused, and the band was past their prime. The tour’s legacy has been similarly poor as well, especially regarding the off-stage developments involving Sammy Hagar and Michael Anthony. Nick Deriso of Ultimate Classic Rock called the tour “disastrous."

Background 
The 2004 tour was the first time that Van Halen had played together since 1998, with then lead singer Gary Cherone. In 2004, Van Halen reunited with Sammy Hagar, their second lead vocalist from 1985–1996, who had split with the band due to tensions with Eddie Van Halen. Hagar claimed that the 1996 split resulted from disagreements over recording new tracks for the movie Twister, after he was exhausted from touring in support of the band’s album Balance. According to Hagar, he was then informed that the songs the band had recorded would be released without his vocals and were not going to be used for the Twister soundtrack, but for a greatest-hits album, which Hagar opposed. However, Eddie Van Halen claimed that the tensions with Hagar stemmed from the singer’s decision to produce his own “solo best-of set,” which increased tensions when Hagar then refused to partake in the Van Halen greatest hits release.  Van Halen turned to David Lee Roth, the band’s first lead singer, to replace Hagar as the band's lead singer.

The 2004 reunion tour resulted after Sammy Hagar decided to call drummer Alex Van Halen in 2003 and “hit it off like old times." After Hagar then called lead guitarist Eddie Van Halen, the band was once again reunited.

Originally, the band planned to release a full-length album, titled The Best of Both Worlds, which would have featured the instrumentals from the aborted second album with Gary Cherone, with Hagar on vocals. This plan was abandoned because Eddie Van Halen was only able to complete three of the tracks. They decided to release a new compilation double album featuring three new songs, which was to be followed by a reunion tour. The new songs were "It's About Time", "Up for Breakfast" and "Learning to See". Initially, 28 dates were announced, but the tour was extended to 80 across five months.

Michael Anthony originally thought that the tour would expand to Europe, Japan, and South America, but the idea was abandoned because of Hagar's feud with Eddie Van Halen.

Controversies 
Hagar’s reunion with the band, and relationship with Eddie Van Halen, began well. In August 2004, Hagar said that he and Eddie Van Halen were going to “Pretend like it [the feud] never happened. We’re going to rise above it.” In an early review of the tour, Hagar was described as “undeniably delighted to be back together” with Van Halen. However, Hagar and Van Halen’s feelings of good ended up being short-lived.

Hagar accused Eddie of drinking too much, despite Eddie's denials: "It was horrible to know a person that was in that kind of shape." In his memoir, Hagar wrote that during the tour Van Halen was “unkempt, hunched over, frighteningly skinny” and “drinking wine straight out of a bottle." Van Halen was reported to have collapsed during the tour as well, in addition to playing poorly due to his struggles with substance abuse. Eddie Van Halen said that he was “an alcoholic” and that in 2004 he became a “very angry drunk,” although he claimed that Hagar’s memoir was “definitely embellished."

Another point of contention during the tour was Sammy Hagar’s promotion of his Cabo Wabo tequila brand, to the displeasure of Eddie Van Halen. Bassist Michael Anthony said that “he [Eddie Van Halen] was never happy about that, the whole Cabo Wabo thing.” Anthony claimed that Sammy independently contracted with arenas to sell the tequila, which “would create some tension onstage and offstage." Hagar claims he was told by the Van Halen brothers, before the tour, that he would not be allowed to promote his Cabo Wabo tequila, so he purposefully “got a Cabo Wabo tattoo” on his arm and “wore short sleeves."

The tour also caused controversy with Michael Anthony, the band's longtime bassist (performing with them until 2000 when they went on hiatus, but still officially a member in 2004). Anthony was hired as a touring musician rather than a 'real' member of the band, resulting in being paid a reduced commission. Initially, the Van Halen brothers did not want him on the tour at all, but Sammy Hagar refused to tour without him.

The tour also resulted in a legal dispute between Van Halen and the Baltimore Orioles. The Orioles had contracted Van Halen to perform a September 2 concert at Oriole Park at Camden Yards for $1.5 million, in addition to 80 percent of ticket and merchandise revenues. However, the Orioles later canceled this deal, causing Van Halen to file a lawsuit in the U.S. District Court in Los Angeles, suing for at least $2 million. Van Halen argued that they lost potential revenue in the Baltimore area from a non-compete clause and that they had to rearrange the 2004 tour for the show that the Orioles’ reneged on.

Reception 
According to Pollstar, the tour grossed $54.3 million, making it the sixth highest grossing tour of 2004. Pollstar reports that the tour had an average ticket price of $99.12 and sold 1,054,238 tickets over 83 shows. However, according to Billboard Boxscore, the tour grossed nearly $40 million.

Critical reception for the tour was generally negative, with some reviews alleging that the tour was a watered-down version of the band’s past versions. Jason Bracelin, of the Houston Press, wrote that “In their prime, the guys in Van Halen were as sticky, sweaty, and accident-prone as the best keggers. Now, they’re hard-rock parental units approaching their fifties, and so are many of their fans." Kyle Munson, of The Des Moines Register, wrote that Van Halen sounded “sloppy” and alleged that Hagar seemed more focused with signing autographs than singing. However, Doug Fox, after a performance in Salt Lake City, wrote that the future of Van Halen “seems to be on firmer ground as well with the return of Hagar."

Legacy 
Overall, the tour’s long term reputation has been similarly poor, being described as both “Disastrous” by Nick Deriso of Ultimate Classic Rock and “Ill-Fated” by Andy Greene of Rolling Stone. The tour also is notable for its lasting damage on the relationship between lead singer Sammy Hagar and lead guitarist Eddie Van Halen. Sammy Hagar, in his memoir, wrote that after the 2004 tour, his relationship with Eddie Van Halen was “irretrievably broken." By the end of the tour, Anthony and Hagar reportedly used “different jets, different hotels, different limos, different security details" from the Van Halen brothers.

The tour also signaled the declining relationship between bassist Michael Anthony and the band. Allegedly, Alex and Eddie Van Halen did not want to tour with Anthony, while Hagar insisted upon his presence in the band. Anthony ended up being forced to relinquish his Van Halen licensing rights in addition to a pay cut. Anthony claims he accepted the deal because he thought it may have been the last time the band would ever perform together. In 2006, Eddie Van Halen fired Anthony from the band and replaced him with his son, Wolfgang Van Halen.

Setlist
Typical Setlist

 "Jump"
 "Runaround"
 "Humans Being"
 "Up for Breakfast"
 Bass solo
 "Somebody Get Me a Doctor"
 "Poundcake"
 "It's About Time"
 Drum solo
 "Top of the World"
 "Unchained"
 "Why Can't This Be Love"
 "Eagles Fly"
 "Deeper Kinda Love"
 "Learning to See"
 "Best of Both Worlds"
 Guitar solo
 "Dreams"
 "Ain't Talkin' 'bout Love"
 "Right Now"
 "You Really Got Me"
 "Panama"
 "When It's Love"
 "Runnin' with the Devil" (occasionally with Michael Anthony on vocals)
 "The Seventh Seal" (occasionally)
 "Finish What Ya Started" (occasionally)

Personnel
Sammy Hagar – lead vocals, guitar
Eddie Van Halen – lead guitar, keyboards, backing vocals
Michael Anthony – bass guitar, backing vocals
Alex Van Halen – drums, percussion
Additional musician
Wolfgang Van Halen – rhythm guitar (during "316")

Tour dates

References

External links 
 Van-Halen.com – The official Van Halen website
 Van Halen NewsDesk

Van Halen concert tours
2004 concert tours